Information Technology Lokam (or IT Lokam) is a monthly computer magazine in Malayalam. It was started in 2001 by Infofriend Publications, in Kozhikode. The magazine is the first venture of the company.

In September 2005, IT Lokam inaugurated a CD edition, like its competitor, Info Kairali. The IT Lokam CD mainly contains free software programs and games, useful articles, demo and shareware programs, wallpapers, drivers, skins, etc.

References

External links
Official website

2001 establishments in Kerala
Computer magazines published in India
Monthly magazines published in India
Magazines established in 2001
Malayalam-language magazines